eHealth, Inc. dba eHealthInsurance is a private online marketplace for health insurance, organized in Delaware and based in Santa Clara, California. The company primarily provides plans related to Medicare such as prescription drug plans, Medigap, and Medicare Advantage plans. The company also sells individual plans, competing with health insurance marketplaces. The company sells plans in all 50 U.S. states and the District of Columbia from 170 health insurance carriers.  Its large staff of licensed agents assist consumers with little or no computer experience with their online enrollments.

The company has a corporate office in Santa Clara, California, and satellite offices in Gold River, California, Salt Lake City, Utah, Austin, Texas  and Indianapolis, Indiana.

History
eHealth, Inc. was founded in 1997.

In 2006, the company became a public company via an initial public offering.

In 2010, eHealth acquired PlanPrescriber, Inc. for $28.7 million in cash. PlanPrescriber provides tools to help people choose the right Medicare plan.

In 2013, eHealth, along with other "web brokers", signed deals with Healthcare.gov to enroll subsidy-eligible consumers in the newly approved health plans offered through the Patient Protection and Affordable Care Act.

In 2014, eHealth acquired the Medicare.com domain name for $4.8 million.

In March 2015, the company announced 72 layoffs, with plans to lay off 160 people.

In May 2016, the company appointed Scott Flanders, a director of the company since 2008, as CEO.  Former CEO Gary Lauer continued in an advisory role through the end of 2016.

In August 2016, eHealth announced that it had insured 5 million people.

In 2017, the company said it rejected takeover offers.

In 2018, eHealth acquired GoMedigap, a consumer acquisition and engagement electronic platform tailored to Medigap insurance.

In 2019 eHealth announced the development of an Eastern Headquarters in Indianapolis, Indiana.

In March 2020, eHealth announced its follow-on public offering of 1,800,000 shares, priced at $115/share, of its common stock, designed to raise an additional $207M.  Three days later they announced the closing of the offering, with the 275,000 share option also having been exercised, raising a net proceeds of approximately $227.5 million after deducting underwriting discounts and commissions and the estimated expenses of the offering.

In November 2021, eHealth appointed Fran Soistman as CEO. Former CEO Scott Flanders continued in an advisory role through the end of 2021.

Political involvement
In 2013, eHealth's former CEO, Gary Lauer encouraged governors that are planning to create their own online healthcare marketplaces to adopt a cost-free enrollment strategy.

In 2015, eHealth's former CEO, Gary Lauer advocated reforms to help the middle-class afford health insurance.

In 2017, eHealth CEO Scott Flanders argued publicly for changes to the Affordable Care Act in order to lower costs for self-employed, middle-class workers who cannot afford health insurance.

References

External links
 Official website

Financial services companies established in 1997
1997 establishments in California
Internet properties established in 1997
2006 initial public offerings
Companies listed on the Nasdaq
Health insurance in the United States
Online marketplaces of the United States
Health insurance marketplaces
Companies based in Santa Clara, California